The Unemployment Assistance Board was a body created in Britain by the Unemployment Act 1934 due to the high levels of inter-war poverty in Britain. The Board kept a system of means-tested benefits and increased the number of people who could claim relief.

References

Poverty in the United Kingdom
Welfare state in the United Kingdom
1934 establishments in the United Kingdom
1934 in politics
Unemployment in the United Kingdom